Kim Ryun-do (born 9 July 1991) is a South Korean footballer who plays as forward for FC  Anyang in K League 2.

Career
He was selected by Bucheon FC 1995 in the 2014 K League draft.

References

External links 

1991 births
Living people
Association football forwards
South Korean footballers
Bucheon FC 1995 players
Asan Mugunghwa FC players
K League 2 players